KWJJ-FM (99.5 MHz) is a commercial radio station in Portland, Oregon.  It is owned by Audacy, Inc. and airs a country music and southern rock radio format.  The studio is on SW Bancroft Street, near downtown Portland. The station transmitter is atop Portland's West Hills, off SW Fairmount Court.

History

Beautiful music KJIB
The station signed on the air on September 16, 1968, as KJIB.  It was a stand-alone FM station, not attached to an AM station.  KJIB was owned by Contemporary FM, Inc., with Bernard D. Seitz serving as owner and general manager.  It aired a beautiful music format featuring mostly instrumental cover versions of popular songs along with Broadway and Hollywood showtunes.  The call sign referred to "jib," a sail used on sail boats.

In 1974, KJIB was acquired by Park Communications, which owned other easy listening stations around the country.  A year earlier, Park bought KWJJ (AM 1080), a longtime Portland country music station.  For the first years of Park ownership, KJIB remained easy listening and KWJJ remained country.

Switch to country
In the late 1970s, Park moved KJIB from mainstream easy listening to a new format known as "Beautiful Country."  The sound was soft, but used instrumental cover versions of country songs, rather than pop songs.

KJIB switched to a conventional country format in the early 1980s.  The FM station played mostly contemporary country hits with only a small amount of DJ chatter, while the AM station continued as a personality-oriented country outlet, going back several decades for its playlist of country tunes.  On August 19, 1985, KJIB changed its call sign to the current KWJJ-FM.  The two stations simulcasted the morning show and some other segments during the day.  In 1995, KWJJ became a network affiliate for ABC's Real Country, a classic country service.

Change in ownership
In 1996, Seattle-based Fisher Communications bought KWJJ-AM-FM for $35 million.  Fisher continued the mainstream country format on KWJJ-FM and briefly continued the classic country format on KWJJ (AM).  The following year, KWJJ (AM) became hot talk KOTK.

In 2003, Fisher Communications sold KOTK and KWJJ-FM to Entercom for $44 million.  Entercom changed KOTK to all-sports as KFXX.  KWJJ-FM continued as a country outlet.  On January 6, 2004, KWJJ-FM rebranded as "99.5 The Wolf."

Jingles and Imaging
KWJJ uses the "Reelworld One Country" jingles package and imaging service after dropping the "IQ Beats" custom package in 2009. Sweepers are done by Emily Mcintosh and Jack Murphy. This is Mcintosh's tenth country client and her fifth "Wolf" station to do sweepers and custom liners.

HD Radio
KWJJ broadcasts in the HD Radio format.  The station carries two co-owned sports radio stations on its subchannels; KWJJ-FMHD2 airs a simulcast of KFXX, known as "The Fan." On October 26, 2015, KWJJ-FMHD3 launched with a simulcast of KMTT, known as "910 ESPN Portland."

See also
List of radio stations in Washington

References

External links

WJJ
Country radio stations in the United States
Radio stations established in 1968
1968 establishments in Oregon
Audacy, Inc. radio stations